List of Guggenheim Fellowships awarded in 2020: Guggenheim Fellowships have been awarded annually since 1925, by the John Simon Guggenheim Memorial Foundation to those "who have demonstrated exceptional capacity for productive scholarship or exceptional creative ability in the arts."

References 

2020
2020 awards
Gugg